Burduna (also known as Purduna, Bayungu, or Payungu) is an Aboriginal language that was traditionally spoken in the region between the Ashburton and Gascyone rivers in north-western Australia, often referred to as the 'Pilbara' region. It belongs to the Kanyara group of languages, which also includes Binigura/Pinikura (also known as Thalanyji).

The language is now classified as critically endangered, with no recorded native speakers as of 2004. However, there are some people of Burduna heritage who can still speak and recognize a few words and phrases.

Culture and development 
The Burduna people were located around the Nyang and Maroonah regions between the Ashburton and Gascyone rivers in north-western Australia. Their traditional country regions included the regions around the Yannarie and Lyndon rivers. Some of the area in and around the Towera region is also identified as being traditional Burduna land. 

The Kanyara people traditionally spoke three different languages - Purduna or Burduna, Thalanyji, and Bayungu or Payungu. The three languages share highly similar sentence structure and vocabulary, with 60-70% of words being common across all three of them. 

The societal structure of the Burduna people consisted of four different subsets. Each subset was further divided into 'totems', and each totem was further divided into ''. Marriages within the same totem  were not allowed. 

Often, these totems and  interspersed with people from different linguistic backgrounds. For example, the totem 'Snake' included the Burduna-speaking population as well as the Thalanyji-speaking population.   

As a result of white settlement along the Ashburton and Gascyone river regions, the language ceased to be used, and is believed to have died out sometime during the first half of the twentieth century. There are a few people living in Onslow and Carnarvon who can still speak and recognize a few words and phrases, but the majority of Burduna descendants have intermarried with other language groups. The National Language Indigenous 2004 Survey  estimated that there are no native speakers of the language. It has thus been classified as endangerment level 0.

Lexicon and grammar 
There are two major word classes and three minor ones in the Burduna language. The first major word class contains the nominal words, which includes nouns and adjectives, names, pronouns, demonstratives, and cardinal directions.

The second major word group includes the verbs. The three minor word groups include adverbs, particles, and interjections.

Evolution 
Burduna has been classified as a double-marking language. Although it has been categorized as a Kanyara language, it is significantly different from the other languages in the category as it underwent a number of changes in pronunciation. 

Over the years, the language lost most of its nasal sounds and tones. Certain words that contains peripheral stops with p  and k sounds lenited to a w sound instead. For example, papu (father) became , and puka (bad) became . However, this lenition did not occur when the previous syllable contained a w. Instead, the consonants p and k descended, and were pronounced as b and g respectively.

These words lost their middle consonants and were shortened to yaan and puurra. The vowels were pronounced with a long, drawn-out sound.

Furthermore, words that originally contained consonant clusters underwent lenition and were pronounced with softer sounds. For example, mb was pronounced as p, nd as t, and ngg as k. 

In addition, where other languages have a dh or a j in the middle of words, Burduna evolved to contain a y.

References

Kanyara languages
Endangered indigenous Australian languages in Western Australia